Hudson Maxim (February 3, 1853 – May 6, 1927), was a U.S. inventor and chemist who invented a variety of explosives, including smokeless gunpowder, Thomas Edison referred to him as "the most versatile man in America". He was the brother of Hiram Maxim, inventor of the Maxim gun and uncle of Hiram Percy Maxim, inventor of the Maxim Silencer.

Career
Maxim started his career in 1881 as the publisher of Real Pen Work - Self Instructor in Penmanship, a book addressing the arts of calligraphy and  penmanship, and the sale of special inks, pens, and other supplies related to penmanship.  Later he joined his brother Hiram Stevens Maxim's workshop in the United Kingdom, where they both worked on the improvement of smokeless gunpowder. After some disputes, Hudson Maxim returned to the United States and developed a number of stable high explosives, the rights of which were sold to the DuPont company.

Maxim wrote a book, Defenseless America, first issued in 1912, in which he pointed out the inferiority of the American defense system and the vulnerability of the country against attacks of foreign aggressors. At that time, the United States army according to Maxim, had a total strength of 81,000 men of which 29,000 were assigned to man coastal artillery batteries at major ports. This explains the need for the United States to use National Guard troops in its campaign against Mexico in 1916. The book was reissued in 1916 after his good friend, Elbert Hubbard, died on the RMS Lusitania when it was torpedoed by a German submarine. This event fueled his belief that the USA should improve its defenses and join the war against Germany on the side of the Entente.

Maxim also wrote the book The Science of Poetry and the Philosophy of Language about the nature and writing of poetry. In this work, he contended that words, like chemical particles, had natural laws that governed the manner in which they could be combined into verse, and that poetry perceived as excellent was in fact one that conformed to those laws. He also argued that certain famous poets (William Shakespeare, William Wordsworth) had discovered those laws and put them to use in their poetry.

During his experimental career, he lost his left hand in a mercury fulminate explosion in 1894.

Personal
During the last 25 years of his life, Maxim spent most of his time at his home on the shores of Lake Hopatcong, New Jersey. He was a great promoter and supporter of the development of Lake Hopatcong and the Borough of Hopatcong and is honored by memorials in Hopatcong State Park and the Borough of Hopatcong's Maxim Glen Park.  He spoke and wrote prolifically on many topics - from his opposition to maintaining the Morris Canal, to his disdain of Prohibition, to his love of poetry and boxing.

Maxim appeared as King Neptune during the first two years of the Miss America Pageant in 1921 and 1922, arriving on a great float and presenting the trophy to the winner.

He was an important member of the College of Fellows of the Academy of Nations.

Bibliography
Man's Machine-Made Millennium, future-predicting article in Cosmopolitan, Vol. 45, No. 6, November 1908, pag. 568, illustrated by William R. Leigh. 
The Science of Poetry and The Philosophy of Language. By Hudson Maxim, Funk & Wagnalls Company, 1910.
Lake Hopatcong the Beautiful. By Hudson Maxim, The McConnell Printing Co., New York, New York, 1913.
Dynamite Stories. By Hudson Maxim, Hearst's International Library Co. 1916.
Defenseless America. By Hudson Maxim, Hearst's International Library Co. 1916.
The Science of Poetry and the Philosophy of Language  By Hudson Maxim Funk and Wagnalls Company, New York
Leading Opinions Both For and Against National Defense. Compiled by Hudson Maxim, Hearst's International Library Co., 1916
Hudson Maxim, Reminiscences and Comments. By Clifton Johnson, Doubleday, Page & Company, 1924.

References

Lake Hopatcong News

External links

Hudson Maxim School in Hopatcong, NJ
Lake Hopatcong Historical Museum
Hudson Maxim in ACADEMY OF NATION - CLIC Digital Collections
Hudson Maxim papers (1851-1925) at Hagley Museum and Library
 
 

1853 births
1927 deaths
American chemists
19th-century American inventors
20th-century American inventors
People from Piscataquis County, Maine
People from Hopatcong, New Jersey
Naval Consulting Board
Kents Hill School alumni
Scientists from Maine